Pogonomyrmex californicus, or California harvester ant, is a species of ant in the subfamily Myrmicinae. It is native to North America, where it occurs in the southwestern United States and northern Mexico. It is best known as the ant that is sent out for Uncle Milton's Ant Farm.

Biology
Pogonomyrmex californicus can be found in open, warm, and sandy areas. Typically, it forages during the day as individuals or in a group, forming columns as they work. It preys on arthropods, such as the larvae of the raisin moth (Cadra figulilella), and collects seeds. It can form colonies of hundreds of individuals. The nest entrances are often irregular and are surrounded by loose sand arranged in a circular or semi-circular pattern. Reproduction occurs around July, when reproducing individuals are present.

Polygynous colonies
Pogonomyrmex californicus forms multiple-queen colonies at times. Most colonies are founded and sustained by one queen, but one population has been noted to contain multiple queens in a cooperative, a phenomenon known as pleometrosis.

Range
The distribution of this ant extends from Texas to Utah to Baja California, Sonora, and Chihuahua.

Chumash use as hallucinogen
The Chumash people of California would sometimes use the species as an entheogen with which to initiate boys into manhood. The consumption of these ants was considered a safer method of inducing visions than the more usual method employed which involved the drinking of a brew prepared from the deliriant herb Datura wrightii. The ants were swallowed alive on eagle down and the venom injected in the stings that they inflicted on the mouths and throats of the boys would cause them to hallucinate. Around 250 ants constituted an effective dose.

References

External links

californicus
Insects of Mexico
Insects of the United States
Hymenoptera of North America
Fauna of California
Fauna of the Baja California Peninsula
Fauna of the California chaparral and woodlands
Fauna of the Southwestern United States
Insects described in 1968